Ray Begaye (born February 15, 1954, in Shiprock, New Mexico) is an American politician. He was a member of the New Mexico House of Representatives from the 4th District, from 1999 to 2013. He is a member of the Democratic party.

References

1954 births
Living people
Democratic Party members of the New Mexico House of Representatives
Native American state legislators in New Mexico
People from Shiprock, New Mexico